

Events 
Francesco Geminiani visits Dublin, where he is robbed of a valuable manuscript.
Domenico Cimarosa enters the Conservatorio di Santa Maria di Loreto.
Joseph Haydn enters the service of the Esterházy family

Popular music 
 Mme Papavoine – '"Reviens, aimable Thémire" (Paris)
 John Parry – A collection of Welsh, English & Scotch airs with new variations, also four new lessons for the harp or harpsichord... to which are added twelve airs for the guitar (London: John Johnson)

Opera 
Charles-Guillaume Alexandre – George et Georgette
Johann Christian Bach – Catone in Utica, W.G 2
Pasquale Cafaro – Ipermestra (revised version, premiered Dec. 26 in Naples)
Florian Leopold Gassmann – Catone in Utica
Baldassare Galuppi 
Demetrio (revised version, premiered June in Padua)
Le Tre Amante Ridicoli (premiered Jan. 18 in Venice)
Christoph Willibald Gluck – Le cadi dupé, Wq.29
Niccolò Jommelli – L'Olimpiade
Tommaso Traetta – Armida
Johann Adolf Hasse – Zenobia

Classical music 
Thomas Arne – Judith (oratorio) (first published; first performed 1744)
Charles Avison – 6 Sonatas for Harpsichord, 2 Violins and Cello, Op. 8
Carl Philipp Emanuel Bach 
La Philippine, H.96
La Gabriel, H.97
La Caroline, H.98
La Complaisante, H.109
La Louise, H.114
La Xénophon et la Sybille, H.123
L'Ernestine, H.124
Christoph Willibald Gluck – Don Juan (ballet)
François Joseph Gossec – Sei sinfonie a più stromenti, Op. 5
Joseph Haydn 
Symphony No. 6 ("Le matin")
Symphony No. 7 ("Le midi") 
Symphony No. 8 ("Le soir")
Symphony No.11
Michael Haydn – Symphony in C major
Gottfried August Homilius – 32 Praeludia zu geistlichen Liedern vor zwey Claviere und Pedal
Wolfgang Amadeus Mozart – 
Andante in C major for harpsichord, K. 1a
Allegro in C major for harpsichord, K. 1b
Allegro in F major for harpsichord, K. 1c
Minuet in F major for harpsichord, K. 1d
 Simon Simon – Pièces de clavecin, Op. 1
 Ludwig Zoschinger – Concors digitorum discordia seu 4 Partiæ

Methods and theory writings 

 Jean-Philippe Rameau – Origine des sciences

Births 

January 20 – Giovanni Domenico Perotti, composer (died 1825)
January 22 – Georg Nikolaus von Nissen, biographer of Mozart (died 1826)
January 23 – Friedrich von Matthisson, librettist (died 1831)
January 26 – Jens Zetlitz, songwriter (died 1821)
February 15 – Jacob Kimball, Jr., composer (died 1826)
February 20 – Johann Christian Ludwig Abeille, pianist and composer
February 22 – Erik Tulindberg, composer (died 1814)
April 20 – Johann Gottlieb Karl Spazier, composer
May 3 – August von Kotzebue, librettist (died 1819)
June 13 – Antonín Vranický or Wranitzky, violinist and composer (died 1820)
June 15 – Charles Henry Wilton, British musician (died 1832)
July 20 – Joseph Lefebvre, composer
September 24 – F.L.Æ. Kunzen, composer
October 9 – Pierre Gaveaux, composer and operatic tenor (died 1825)
date unknown 
Antoine Hugot, composer (died 1803) 
John Andrew Stevenson, composer (died 1833)

Deaths 
January 3 – Willem de Fesch, violinist and composer (born 1687)
January 18 – Francesco Feo, opera composer (born 1691)
February 15 – Carlo Cecere, composer (born 1706)
March 7 – Antonio Palella, composer
March 27 – Johann Ludwig Steiner, composer
 April 10 – Cecilia Elisabeth Würzer, German-Swedish singer
June 12 – Meinrad Spiess, composer
July 9 – Carl Gotthelf Gerlach, organist (born 1704)
October 7 – Johann Pfeiffer, German composer (born 1697)
date unknown
Adam Falckenhagen, lutenist and composer (born 1697)
Newburgh Hamilton, librettist (born 1691)

References

 
18th century in music
Music by year